Gislaine Cristina Souza da Silva (born 22 August 1988), commonly known as Gislaine, is a Brazilian football defender who has played for the Brazil women's national team. A zagueira, she joined Corinthians in 2018 after spending 13 years with São José. A year later, she moved on to Santos.

Club career
After playing futsal for three years at school, 16-year-old Gislaine attended a trial with São José Esporte Clube. Signed as a promising forward, she later developed into a defender. After 13 years at São José, in which she won three Copa Libertadores Femenina titles and the 2014 International Women's Club Championship, Gislaine transferred to Corinthians in January 2018. One year later she joined Santos. In January 2020 she agreed a one-year contract with São Paulo FC.

International career
Gislaine was part of the Brazil under-20 selection at the 2008 FIFA U-20 Women's World Cup.

In December 2012, she was named in the senior Brazil women's national football team for the 2012 International Women's Football Tournament of City of São Paulo. But a broken hand meant that she had to withdraw from selection, to be replaced by Andréia Rosa. She won a first cap for Brazil in September 2013, in a 1–0 win over New Zealand at the 2013 Valais Women's Cup. She was called up to a national team training camp in January 2017.

References

External links

 

1988 births
Living people
Brazilian women's footballers
Brazil women's international footballers
People from São José dos Campos
Women's association football defenders
Sport Club Corinthians Paulista (women) players
São José Esporte Clube (women) players
Santos FC (women) players
São Paulo FC (women) players
Footballers from São Paulo (state)